Dénes Szakály (born 15 March 1988) is a Hungarian football player who plays for MTK.

Club career
On 3 January 2022, Szakály signed with MTK.

Club statistics

Personal life
His brother, Péter Szakály, is also a footballer.

References

External links
 Profile
 

1988 births
Living people
People from Nagyatád
Hungarian footballers
Hungary under-21 international footballers
Association football midfielders
Kaposvári Rákóczi FC players
Fehérvár FC players
Zalaegerszegi TE players
Puskás Akadémia FC players
Paksi FC players
Mezőkövesdi SE footballers
BFC Siófok players
MTK Budapest FC players
Nemzeti Bajnokság I players
Nemzeti Bajnokság II players
Sportspeople from Somogy County